Kilimanoor Grama Panchayat  is a panchayath in Thiruvananthapuram district in the state of Kerala, India.

References

Villages in Thiruvananthapuram district